Dumnamene Robinson Dekor (born 1968) also known as Rt. Hon. Dum Dekor is a Nigerian politician who was Deputy Speaker of the Rivers State House of Assembly from 2007 to 2011. He represented Khana II in the 6th Rivers State House of Assembly.  On 15 September 2017, he was sworn in as a commissioner-designee by Governor Ezenwo Nyesom Wike and on 20 September, he was assigned to the Rivers State Ministry of Works. Rt. Hon. Dum Dekor was elected to the House of Representatives as member representing Khana/Gokana Federal Constituency of Rivers State since 2019. He is a member of Rivers State Peoples Democratic Party (PDP).

Early life and education
Dekor attended the University of Port Harcourt and graduated in 1991, obtaining a bachelor's degree in Geography.

Political career
Dumnamene Deekor was one time Assistant speaker house of assembly, was later (on 15 September 2017) sworn in as Commissioner of works under Gov. Nyesom Wike regime  and later ran for the Rivers State House of Representative of which the result is still pending. He is from beeri community in Khana Local Government Area of Rivers State in Nigeria. He is the second son of the family.

Deputy Speaker, Rivers State House of Assembly

Commissioner for Works

Member House of Representatives

References

1968 births
Living people
Members of the Rivers State House of Assembly
University of Port Harcourt alumni
Rivers State Commissioners of Works